Yellowman or yellaman is a chewy, bright yellow, toffee-textured honeycomb produced in Northern Ireland.

Yellowman is sold in non-standard blocks and chips and is associated with the Ould Lammas Fair in Ballycastle, County Antrim, where it is sold along with other confectionery and often dulse. 

Yellowman is similar to honeycomb toffee, except that the more solid 'rind' usually consists of at least half the quantity. The rind is hard, having a similar consistency to rock. Yellowman needs to be heated to high temperatures to get the golden syrup and sugar mixture to reach the ‘hard-crack’ (149 °C/300 °F) – the temperature at which boiled sugar becomes brittle when cooled. It will also only acquire its unique bubbly and crunchy consistency when a reaction occurs between the vinegar and the baking soda, which vigorously adds carbon dioxide gas throughout the mixture.

Ingredients of yellowman are commonly quoted as including brown sugar, golden syrup, butter, vinegar and bicarbonate of soda but there are many local variations in ingredients and recipes.

See also
 Northern Irish cuisine

References

Cuisine of Northern Ireland
British confectionery
Irish confectionery
Candy